Huscote was a tiny hamlet on the edge of north Oxfordshire, a rural area bordering with West Northamptonshire. The hamlet sits East of J11 of the M40. Predominantly agricultural land used for grazing.  Census returns from the 1800s show houses at Huscote, but today only Huscote Farm remains

There are 42 tree preservation orders on Huscote Farm today

See also
History of Banbury
Banbury Cheese
Nethercote, Banbury

References 

Hamlets in Oxfordshire
Banbury